Saramandaia may refer to either of two Brazilian telenovelas produced and aired by Rede Globo:

 Saramandaia (1976 TV series)
 Saramandaia (2013 TV series)